Dawid Lande (14 April 1868 – 10 September 1928) was a Polish architect.

Lande was born in Łódź, where he attended the trade school, and travelled to Saint Petersburg to study at the Institute of Civil Engineering. After completing his studies, he worked for two years in Berlin at the architect office "Keyser und Grossheim" before he travelled back to his home town to set up his own business there.

Dawid Lande was one of the city's most popular architects of the time, known for his projects in Łódź and Warsaw. He was best known for the Russian National Bank in Łódź, Dawid Sendrowicz’ brick house, Hotel Grand, Leon Rappaport's villa and Mieczysław Pinkus’ brick house. He died in Karlovy Vary, aged 60.

References

1868 births
Architects from Łódź
1928 deaths